Credos is an advertising think-tank established in early 2010 by the Advertising Association, as part of their mission to re-build public trust in advertising and maintain the freedom to advertise responsibly in the UK. It is funded by the advertising industry and overseen by an advisory board to assure the quality of its work. Credos' mission is to 'understand advertising': its role, how it works, how it is perceived and its value to UK society and the economy.

Hamish Pringle, Director General at the IPA, stated  that 'Credos is a big step forward for the industry and we're delighted to see Tim Lefroy's 'Front Foot' initiative delivering on its promise so soon, thanks to great support from key advertisers, media owners and agencies.’

People

Credos has been described as the ‘brainchild' 
of Tim Lefroy, the Chief Executive of the Advertising Association. Tim has worked in marketing management at Cadbury plc and Gillette (brand), and was CEO of Young and Rubicam in the UK.

Karen Fraser is Credos’ Director, and her previous work has been featured by BBC2's Newsnight, BBC Radio 4's Today Programme, Radio 5 Live, The Economist, the New Statesman and the Financial Times. She also founded the Ethical Reputation Index (ERI) and won a place on Harvard Business Review's Breakthrough Ideas list for her work on ‘conflicted consumers’. Mark Choeke, writing for Marketing Week in December 2010, states that 'as industry champions go, these two are perfectly placed and sufficiently experienced to help rebuild trust and confidence in the work that marketers do.’

Credos is chaired by James Best, who is Chairman of the Committee of Advertising Practice, a non-Executive Director of social marketing agency ICE, and Vice Chair of the Deborah Hutton Campaign. He served as President of the European Association of Communications Agencies from 2003–2005, was Chairman of the UK Advertising Association from 1997 to 2002, and is a Fellow of the IPA.

Credos’ advisory board includes Will Hutton, the executive vice-chair of the Work Foundation; Nick Chater, professor of behavioural science at Warwick Business School; Andrew Walmsley, entrepreneur and founder of digital communications agency i-level; Chris Mundy, managing director of Clearcast; Fiona Wood, Central Office of Information board director and head of research, insight and engagement; Mandy Pooler, director for development at Kantar, the holding group for the research and consultancy businesses owned by WPP Group; and Rory Sutherland, vice-chairman of WPP's Ogilvy Group in the UK and also IPA president.

Activities
Credos’ first piece of marketing research, published in March 2011 and entitled ‘Advertising: What the UK really thinks’, explored two themes: public perceptions of advertising, and the views of professionals thought to have most influence in shaping attitudes towards advertising. The research was carried out in response to data published by the Advertising Association, which showed a notable decline in public favourability towards advertising since the mid-1990s. The findings were covered mainly in trade press, including Marketing Week, Campaign, and The Drum.

Credos also contributed to the government-commissioned 'Bailey Review' on the commercialisation and sexualisation of childhood, 'Letting Children be Children'. The Review was led by CEO of the Mothers' Union Reg Bailey, and aimed to assess whether children in the UK are being pressured to grow up too quickly, as well as setting out some of the things that businesses and their regulators, as well as government, can do to minimise the commercialisation and sexualisation of childhood. Credos commissioned Dr Barbie Clarke of Family, Kids and Youth  to conduct qualitative and quantitative research to explore parental concerns of childhood.

Credos held an event at the Mothers' Union - 'Credos Briefing: Bailey Review - Research, Outcomes and Impliations' - to present its findings, with Reg Bailey speaking about the Review. Writing for the Telegraph, Harry Wallop covered the event, reporting the problems with younger users activating Facebook accounts. Despite the over-13 age restriction, Karen Fraser described how 'in a series of focus groups earlier this month she had discovered that "80 per cent to 90 per cent" of those under 13 were signed up to Facebook.' As such, she added that 'if an 8-year-old pretends to be 13 to sign up, when they are actually 13 the site will allow advertising from gambling, alcohol and cosmetic surgery companies to be targeted at their page because Facebook will think they are 18.'.

Policy Interests
Credos has produced 10 publications to date, focusing on children, alcohol and youth marketing, MPs' attitudes to advertising, general public attitudes to advertising, and airbrushing and body confidence. Their forthcoming reports focus on the economic value of advertising to the economy and the future of advertising, among others.

References

External links
 Credos 
 Advertising Association 

Think tanks based in the United Kingdom
2010 establishments in the United Kingdom
Think tanks established in 2010
Advertising in the United Kingdom